The Nossa Senhora da Graça Fort, officially Conde de Lippe Fort and known historically as La Lippe, is a fort in the village of Alcáçova, about  north of the town of Elvas in the Portalegre District of Portugal.

It stands in a dominant position on the Monte da Graça (Hill of Grace) and forms part of the Garrison Border Town of Elvas and its Fortifications, which on 30June 2012 was classified as a UNESCO World Heritage Site.

In 2014, the fort became part of a new project under the aegis of the Portuguese Ministry of National Defense, with the support of Turismo de Portugal (Portuguese Tourism), which features historical itineraries based on Portuguese heroes.

History
The strategic importance of the fort was demonstrated during the Portuguese Restoration War, when in 1658 Spanish troops occupied the site during the siege of the town of Elvas prior to the Battle of the Lines of Elvas on 14January 1659.

A century later, during the Seven Years' War (1756-1763) King Joseph I of Portugal and the Marquis of Pombal called on Marshal Lippe to reorganize the Portuguese army and draw up plans for the modernization of the stronghold. He drew a nearly identical copy of his home fortress Wilhelmstein, which he built in 1761.

The work began in 1763 and continued into the reign of Maria I of Portugal (r. 1777–1816), with the fort reopening in 1792 under the name of Conde de Lippe Fort after its designer.

The fort resisted Spanish troops during the 1801 War of the Oranges and a later attack in 1811 during the Peninsular War by the troops of Marshall Jean-de-Dieu Soult.

In September 1808, when the Spanish General Galluzzo heard of the signing of the Convention of Cintra, under which the defeated French were allowed to evacuate their troops from Portugal, he refused to acknowledge it. Instead he proceeded to carry out "a trifling bombardment of La Lippe from an immense distance, and the utmost damage sustained or likely to be sustained by that fortress, was the knocking away the cornices and chimney's of the governor's house, every other part being protected by bomb proofs of the finest masonry." The French commander of the La Lippes's garrison, Captain Girod de Novillars, held out against the Spanish until late November when the 1,200 French troops inside marched out following the arrival of the British.

Subsequently used as a military prison, by 2014 the site was in a near ruinous condition and awaited transfer to the Municipality of Elvas for restoration. The necessary work on the infrastructure was completed in September 2015 with the aim of turning the fort into a functional museum.

Description
The fort is a  quadrangle with pentagonal bastions at the corners. Four ravelins cover the curtain wall, half of which form part of the monumental gate (Dragon Gate).

The central part of the square features a circular redoubt with two floors and a parapet with gun ports. The fort's circular tower has two vaulted floors: the first consisting of a decorated chapel and the second the Governor's House. Below the chapel, carved into the rock, there is a cistern.

Externally, the structure is completed by a hornwork and a wide dry moat.

A 19th century visitor described the fort thus: 

Although many 18th and 19th century military commentators considered the fort impregnable, French General Dumouriez noted that because many of its batteries were set into the rock, they were vulnerable to cannonade fire while he considered the hornwork carried "the defences to great a distance".

Gallery

References

External links
 Video of Forte da Graca/Fort La Lippe
 Plan of the fort at the Bibliothèque nationale de France

Buildings and structures in Elvas
World Heritage Sites in Portugal
Tourist attractions in Portalegre District
National monuments in Portalegre District